William Francis Clarken Jr. (December 31, 1903 – October 2, 1951)  was an American football player and coach. 

Clarken was born in 1903 in East Orange, New Jersey, and attended Saint Benedict's Preparatory School in Newark, New Jersey.

He did not play college football. At age 25, he played professional football in the National Football League (NFL) as a tackle and guard for the Orange Tornadoes. He appeared in five NFL games, one as a starter, during the 1929 season.

From 1942 to 1949, he was the line coach at Bloomfield High School in Bloomfield, New Jersey. He was also the head coach of the 1947 Bloomfield Cardinals of the American Football League. He also coached the Passaic Red Devils. He died in 1951 at age 47.

References

1903 births
1951 deaths
Orange Tornadoes players
Players of American football from New Jersey
St. Benedict's Preparatory School alumni